Mar Ignatius Antony I Samheri (or Antun Semhiri , Samhery, 1801–1864), a converted bishop from the Syriac Orthodox Church, was Patriarch of the Syriac Catholic Church from 1853 to 1864.

Life
Antony Samheri was born on 3 November 1801 in Mosul in a Syriac Orthodox family. He was ordained priest on 15 August 1822 and consecrated coadjutor bishop of Mardin in January 1826 by the Syriac Orthodox Patriarch Ignatius George V.

In the Dayr al-Zafaran monastery he found books about the Catholic Church and he took into the Catholic faith. He spoke with his Patriarch who said him to take time, but on 17 March 1828, with Grégorios Issa Mahfouz bishop of Jerusalem and one hundred fifty families, Antony Samheri formally joined the Syriac Catholic Church. For this act he was imprisoned and humiliated for eight months, till a payment of a ransom to the local Ottoman authority. In 1840 he was appointed patriarchal vicar for the Melkite community in Amid.

He was elected Patriarch of the Syriac Catholic Church on 30 November 1853, enthroned on 8 December 1853, and early in 1854 he traveled to Rome where Pope Pius IX personally invested him on 7 March 1854.

From Rome Antony Samheri went in France (he was the godfather of Louis Napoléon), Belgium and Netherlands to raise funds. After two years of traveling in Europe Rome urged him to return to his flock, where he financed the building of many churches.

He died in Mardin on 16 June 1864. The present bishops of the Syrian Catholic Church derive their apostolic succession from him.

References

Sources

External links
 Biography of Samhiri written in 1855 by Jean Mamarbaschi 

Converts to Eastern Catholicism from Oriental Orthodoxy
Syriac Catholic Patriarchs of Antioch
1864 deaths
1801 births
People from Mosul
19th-century Eastern Catholic archbishops
Assyrians from the Ottoman Empire
19th-century people from the Ottoman Empire
Prisoners and detainees of the Ottoman Empire
Bishops in the Ottoman Empire